South Africa competed at the 2022 Commonwealth Games in Birmingham, England from 28 July to 8 August 2022. It was South Africa's 14th appearance at the Commonwealth Games.

Para-swimmer Christian Sadie and netballer Bongiwe Msomi were the country's flagbearers during the opening ceremony.

Durban initially secured the hosting rights after Edmonton withdrew from the bidding contest, which would have led to the Games being hosted on African soil for the first time. However, the South African government subsequently claimed it would not be possible to host the Games because of financial constraints; as a result, the CGF stripped Durban of their hosting rights in March 2017.

Medalists

| width="78%" align="left" valign="top" |

| width="22%" align="left" valign="top" |

Competitors
The following is the list of number of competitors participating at the Games per sport/discipline.

Note

Athletics

Having qualified through the World Para Athletics World Rankings (for performances registered between 31 December 2020 and 25 April 2022), seven para athletes were selected as of 8 June 2022.

Another two para athletes and twenty-six athletes were added to the squad on 4 July 2022. Luxolo Adams and Shaun Maswanganyi pulled out of the squad after suffering injuries in the World Athletics Championships. Sprinters Clarence Munyai and Emile Erasmus, pole vaulter Kyle Rademeyer and 400m runner Zakhiti Nene had to withdraw due to displaying COVID-19 symptoms. Some athletes also couldn't make it due to transportation errors.

Men
Track and road events

Field events

Women
Track and road events

Field events

Badminton

As of 1 June 2022, South Africa qualified for the mixed team event via the BWF World Rankings. A squad of five players was confirmed on 4 July 2022.

Singles

Doubles

Mixed team

Summary

Squad

Johanita Scholtz
Jarred Elliott
Robert Summers
Deidre Laurens Jordaan
Caden Kakora

Group stage

Quarterfinals

3x3 basketball

On 9 October 2021, South Africa qualified for both the men's and women's wheelchair tournaments. This was achieved by both teams winning the IWBF Africa Zone Qualifiers.

Squad selections were announced on 8 June 2022.

Summary

Men's wheelchair tournament

Roster
Allen Mtatase
Cecil Dumond
Ayabonga Jim
Simanga Mbhele

Group play

Fifth place match

Women's wheelchair tournament

Roster
Aviwe Ngoni
Samkelisiwe Mbatha
Michelle Moganedi
Kelebogile Moeng

Group play

Fifth place match

Beach volleyball

As of 26 April 2022, South Africa qualified for the men's tournament. This was achieved through their position at the African Qualifier in Accra.

Two players were selected as of 8 June 2022.

Men's tournament

Group B

Boxing

Three boxers were selected as of 8 June 2022.

Cricket

By virtue of its position in the ICC Women's T20I rankings (as of 1 April 2021), South Africa qualified for the tournament.

Fixtures were announced in November 2021.

Summary

Roster
The final squad was announced on 15 July 2022.

 Suné Luus (c)
 Anneke Bosch
 Trisha Chetty
 Lara Goodall
 Sinalo Jafta
 Marizanne Kapp
 Ayabonga Khaka
 Masabata Klaas
 Nadine de Klerk
 Nonkululeko Mlaba
 Mignon du Preez
 Tumi Sekhukhune
 Shabnim Ismail
 Chloe Tryon
 Laura Wolvaardt

Group play

Cycling

Eleven cyclists were selected as of 8 June 2022.

Road
Men

Women

Mountain bike

Gymnastics

A squad of five gymnasts was selected as of 8 June 2022. Two gymnasts were added to the squad on 4 July 2022.

Artistic
Men
Individual Qualification

Individual Final

Women
Team Final & Individual Qualification

Individual Finals

Rhythmic
Individual Qualification

Individual Finals

Hockey

By virtue of their position in the FIH World Rankings for men and women respectively (as of 1 February 2022), South Africa qualified for both tournaments.

Detailed fixtures were released on 9 March 2022.

Summary

Men's tournament

Roster
A squad of eighteen players was selected as of 4 July 2022.

Connor Beauchamp
Gowan Jones
Daniel Bell
Ryan Julius
Matt Guise-Brown
Tevin Kok
Dayaan Cassiem
Peabo Lembethe
Mustapha Cassiem
Samkelo Mvimbi
Timothy Drummond
Siya Nolutshungu
Jethro Eustice
Nqobile Ntuli
Keenan Horne
Taine Paton
Le-Neal Jackson
Nicholas Spooner

Reserves: Sihle Ngubane, Matt de Sousa

Group play

Semi-final

Bronze medal match

Women's tournament

Roster
A squad of eighteen players was selected as of 8 June 2022.

Bernadette Coston
Bianca Wood
Edith Molikoe
Erin Christie
Hannah Pearce
Hanrie Louw
Jean-Leigh du Toit
Kristen Paton
Lisa-Marie Deetlefs
Lilian du Plessis
Maboloke Serage
Marizen Marais
Onthatile Zulu
Phumelela Mbande
Quanita Bobbs
Robyn Johnson
Shirndré-Lee Simmons
Tarryn Lombard

Reserves: Kayla de Waal, Charné Maddocks, Kirsty Adams, Sylvia van Jaarsveld & Mathaphelo Ramasimong

Group play

Seventh place match

Judo

A squad of four judoka was selected as of 8 June 2022.

Lawn bowls

A squad of ten players and six parasport players (plus two directors) was officially selected on 8 June 2022.

Men

Women

Parasport

Netball

By virtue of its position in the World Netball Rankings (as of 28 July 2021), South Africa qualified for the tournament.

Partial fixtures were announced in November 2021, then updated with the remaining qualifiers in March 2022.

Summary

Roster

Khanyisa Chawane
Izette Griesel
Phumza Maweni
Tshinakaho Mdau
Bongiwe Msomi (c)
Lefébre Rademan
Nicola Smith
Nichole Taljaard
Elmeré van der Berg
Shadine van der Merwe
Ine-Marí Venter
Zanele Vimbela

Group play

Fifth place match

Rugby sevens

As of 30 April 2022, South Africa qualified for both tournaments. The men qualified through their positions in the 2018–19 / 2019–20 World Rugby Sevens Series, whilst the women qualified by winning the 2022 Africa Women's Sevens in Jemmal, Tunisia.

The rosters of both squads were announced on 8 June 2022.

Summary

Men's tournament

Squad

Sako Makata
Impi Visser
Zain Davids
Angelo Davids
JC Pretorius
Selvyn Davids
Ronald Brown
Dewald Human
Siviwe Soyizwapi
Muller du Plessis
Mfundo Ndhlovu
Christie Grobbelaar
Shaun Williams

Pool B

Quarter–finals

Semi–finals

Gold medal match

Women's tournament

Squad

Donelle Snyders
Felicia Jacobs
Bianca Augustyn
Snenhlanhla Shozi
Mathrin Simmers
Asisipho Plaatjies
Anacadia Minnaar
Unathi Mali
Liske Lategan
Kemisetso Baloyi
Kyla de Vries
Nontuthuko Shongwe
Zandile Masuku

Pool B

Classification semi-finals

Seventh place match

Swimming

A squad of twenty-one swimmers and para swimmers, including Tokyo 2020 champion Tatjana Schoenmaker, was selected as of 8 June 2022. The para swimmers qualified through the World Para Swimming World Rankings (for performances registered between 31 December 2020 and 18 April 2022).

Two swimmers were added to the squad on 4 July 2022.

Men

Women

Mixed

Table tennis

South Africa qualified for both the men's and women's team events via the ITTF World Team Rankings (as of 2 January 2020). Eight players (four per team) were selected as of 8 June 2022.

Singles

Doubles

Team

Triathlon

Six triathletes and three paratriathletes (plus three guides) were selected as of 8 June 2022. The paratriathletes qualified through the World Triathlon Para Rankings of 28 March 2022.

Individual

Paratriathlon

Mixed Relay

Weightlifting

South Africa qualified four weightlifters (three men, one woman) via the IWF Commonwealth Ranking List, which was finalised on 9 March 2022.

Men

Women

Wrestling

A squad of four wrestlers was confirmed on 4 July 2022.

References

External links
Team South Africa Official site

Nations at the 2022 Commonwealth Games
South Africa at the Commonwealth Games
2022 in South African sport